Felicitas Heyne is a German psychologist and book author. She is also the developer of the iPersonic system for personal development, which is available in 26 languages.

Life 

She was born in 1966 in Heidelberg.   She worked at first for some years in economics before she studied psychology at the University of Koblenz-Landau.  She lives and works in Annweiler am Trifels.

Bibliography 

Felicitas Heyne is the author of several books about personality, happiness and relationships.
 "Fremdenverkehr. Warum wir so viel über Sex reden und trotzdem keinen mehr haben." (2012) 
 "Online zur Traumfrau" (2012) 
 "Glücksfitness. Das individuelle Training für mehr Lebensfreude" (2012) 
 "In 90 Tagen zum Traummann" (2010) 
 "Hassgeliebte Schwiegermutter" (2008)

References

Sources
 Personal data and list of publications at the German National Library, .

External links 
 Official website

1966 births
Living people
Writers from Heidelberg
German psychologists
German women psychologists